Mitchelhill is a surname. Notable people with the surname include:

 Barbara Mitchelhill, English writer
 Gwendoline Mitchelhill (died 1989), victim of serial killer John Wayne Glover

See also
 Mitchell (surname)